Favre averaging is the density-weighted averaging method, used in variable density or compressible turbulent flows, in place of the Reynolds averaging. The method was introduced formally by the French scientist A. J. Favre in 1965, although Osborne Reynolds has also already introduced the density-weighted averaging in 1895. The averaging results a simplistic form for the nonlinear convective terms of the Navier-Stokes equations, at the expense of making the diffusion terms complicated.

Favre averaged variables
Favre averaging is carried out for all dynamical variables except the pressure. For the velocity components, the Favre averaging is defined as

The Favre decomposition of the velocity components is then written as

where  is the fluctuating part in the Favre averaging, which satisfies the condition , that is to say, . The Favre-averaged variables are more difficult to measure experimentally than the Reynolds-averaged ones, however, the two variables can be related in an exact manner if correlations between density and the fluctuating quantity is known; this is so because, we can write

The advantage of Favre-averaged variables are clearly seen by taking the normal averaging of the term  that appears in the convective term of the Navier-Stokes equations written in its conserved form. This is given by

As we can see, there are five terms in the averaging when expressed in terms of Reynolds-averaged variables, whereas we have only two terms when it is expressed in terms of Favre-averaged variables.

References

Fluid dynamics
Turbulence
Combustion